Patriarch Nicholas III may refer to:

 Patriarch Nicholas III of Antioch, ruled in 1000–1003
 Nicholas III of Constantinople, Ecumenical Patriarch in 1084–1111
 Patriarch Nicholas III of Alexandria, Greek Patriarch of Alexandria in 1389–1398